The bromine cycle is a biogeochemical cycle of bromine through the atmosphere, biosphere, and hydrosphere.

Sources

Natural sources 
Bromine is present naturally as bromide salts in evaporite deposits. Bromine is also present in soils and in marine algae that synthesize organic bromine compounds. Other natural sources of bromine come from polar regions, salt lakes, and volcanoes.

The primary natural source of bromine to the atmosphere is sea spray aerosols. Smaller fluxes originate from volcanic emissions and biomass burning. The primary atmospheric sinks are sea spray deposition and photochemical reactions, which release gaseous bromine.

Anthropogenic sources 
Bromine is used in flame retardants, pesticides, lighter fuel, antiknocking agents, and for water purification. The organic form of this element is used as flame retardants commercially and in pesticides. These chemicals have led to an increase in the depletion of the stratospheric ozone layer. Some countries use bromine to treat drinking water, similar to chlorination. Bromine is also present as impurities emitted from cooling towers.

Reactions with ozone 
Winter sea ice is a significant atmospheric contribution of bromine. Organic bromine gases such as CH3Br, CH2Br2, CH2IBr are emitted by microorganisms in sea ice and snow at ten-fold higher rates than from other environments. In polar areas, decreasing sea ice releases bromine and at the Arctic and Antarctic boundary layer, bromine is released in the spring when the ice melts.

Inorganic bromine is found in the atmosphere and is quickly cycled between its gas and its particulate phase. Bromine gas (Br2) undergoes an autocatalytic cycle known as the 'bromine explosion', which occurs in the ocean and salt lakes such as the Dead Sea, where a high quantity of salts are exposed to the atmosphere. Bromine contributes to 5-15% of tropospheric ozone layer losses.

References 

Biogeochemistry
Bromine